Piko (stylized PIKO, pronounced "peek-oh") is a German model train brand in Europe that also exports to the United States and other parts of the world.

History
Founded in 1949, PIKO was once a state-owned enterprise in the German Democratic Republic (East Germany), supplying a share of model trains in Eastern Europe.  In 1992, after the reunification of Germany, the company was purchased by PIKO Spielwaren GmbH.  PIKO Spielwaren GmbH was founded in April 1992 by Dr. René F. Wilfer, PIKO’s President, who had been working in the toy industry since 1986 and had previously managed a model building company.

Products
PIKO manufactures more than 1,500  products in various model train scales:

G-Scale:  American and European-prototype weather-resistant models for indoor and outdoor use, including starter sets, locomotives, passenger and freight cars, track, buildings, controls and accessories.

HO-Scale:  European-prototype models including starter sets, locomotives (most in both 2-Rail DC and 3-Rail AC versions), passenger and freight cars, track, buildings, controls and accessories.

TT-Scale:  European-prototype locomotives and cars.

N-Scale:  European-prototype locomotives, cars, and buildings.

Its headquarters factory in Sonneberg (Thuringia) Germany makes the G-Scale and some HO-Scale products, while its PIKO China factory in Chashan, China, makes the HO-Scale "Expert", "Hobby", "SmartControl", "SmartControlLight" and "myTrain" lines, as well as the N-Scale and TT-Scale lines.

Manufacturing

Distribution
In Germany, PIKO products are distributed from the firm's headquarters in Sonneberg to a network of retailers.  In other countries, PIKO distributors and representatives perform a similar function.  In America, sales and distribution to retailers is handled by PIKO America in San Diego, CA.

References

External links 
PIKO official homepage
PIKO official webshop
PIKO America official homepage
News about PIKO G

German brands
Companies based in Thuringia
Model railroad manufacturers
Model manufacturers of Germany
Companies of East Germany
Volkseigene Betriebe
Companies established in 1949
1949 establishments in East Germany